Charis M. Galanakis (Greek:Χάρης Γαλανάκης) is a Greek researcher, and food, agricultural and environmental scientist.

Early life and education
Galanakis was born on April 3, 1981, in Chania, Greece to a family of chemists. He earned his degree in chemistry in 2002 and his certificate for Oenology in 2004, both at the Patras University. He also finished his master's degree in Food Technology in 2004 from Patras University-University of Ioannina-Ulster University. In 2010, he finished his doctoral degree at the Technical University of Crete.

Career
Galanakis started as a Chemist-Oenologist in 2004 in a family-owned business—a laboratory in Chania, Greece. In 2009, Galanakis, along with Eva Tornberg, founded Phenoliv AB which developed a patented process of extracting polyphenol antioxidants from waste water used in olive oil while purifying the same waste water in the same extraction process. The patent, however, was later abandoned due to unknown reasons. In the same year, his first research publication—which highlighted the innovation for the use of dietary fiber suspensions from olive mill wastewater as potential fat replacements in meat products—attracted public interest.

As an agricultural, environmental and food scientist, Galanakis' work is mainly focused on innovation and sustainability in the food industry, particularly more in the activity of "food waste recovery." The same research aims to high added-value compounds from wasted by-products in different stages of food production, re-utilize them in the food chain, and make bigger impact in achieving the Sustainable Development Goals (SDGs)—such as SDGs 2, 3, 6, 12, 13 and 15. This concept of "food waste recovery" was greatly highlighted in the advent of the COVID-19 pandemic which had greatly affected—among others—various global food production chains, food safety, food security, and environmental impacts caused by unsustainable food production around the world.

As an educator, he was a professor in King Saud University; currently, he is now an adjunct professor at Taif University in Saudi Arabia while also serving as a research and innovation director at Galanakis Laboratories in Greece. Aside from being an educator and a multidisciplinary scientist, he had also authored numerous books in his fields of expertise; he is also the founder and the director of Food Waste Recovery Group (SIG5) of ISEKI Food Association in Vienna, Austria; and the editor-in-chief of Discover Food  and Discover Environment journals.

Recognitions
In 2019, 2021, and 2022, Galanakis was recognized as a "Highly Cited Researcher in the field of Agricultural Sciences" by Clarivate's Web of Science. From 2019 until 2022, he has also been consistently named and included in the list of the "World's Top 2% Scientists" by Stanford University.

Selected publications

References

Living people
1981 births
Greek scientists
People from Chania
Environmental scientists
Food scientists